The Romance of Crime is an original novel written by Gareth Roberts and based on the long-running British science fiction television series Doctor Who. It features the Fourth Doctor, Romana II and K-9. It takes place directly before the Missing Adventure The English Way of Death, also by Roberts.

The title is a quotation from the Morrissey song "Sister I'm a Poet".

Plot
The TARDIS brings the Doctor, Romana and K-9 to the Rock of Judgement: a supreme prison built into a rocket-powered asteroid.
What is the link between the gallery of artist Menlove Stokes, and the massacre of a survey team on a far off planet? And why is Margo, Chief Of Security, behaving in such an odd manner?

Audio adaptation 
Big Finish Productions, an audio production company based in the UK, released an audio adaptation in January 2015, starring Tom Baker and Lalla Ward with John Leeson.

References

External links
The Romance of Crime at Big Finish

1995 British novels
1995 science fiction novels
Virgin Missing Adventures
Fourth Doctor novels
Novels by Gareth Roberts (writer)